Responsible government is a conception of a system of government that embodies the principle of parliamentary accountability, the foundation of the Westminster system of parliamentary democracy. Governments (the equivalent of the executive branch) in Westminster democracies are responsible to parliament rather than to the monarch, or, in a colonial context, to the imperial government, and in a republican context, to the president, either in full or in part. If the parliament is bicameral, then the government is responsible first to the parliament's lower house, which is more representative than the upper house, as it usually has more members and they are always directly elected.

Responsible government of parliamentary accountability manifests itself in several ways. Ministers account to Parliament for their decisions and for the performance of their departments. This requirement to make announcements and to answer questions in Parliament means that ministers must have the privileges of the "floor", which are only granted to those who are members of either house of Parliament.  Secondly, and most importantly, although ministers are officially appointed by the authority of the head of state and can theoretically be dismissed at the pleasure of the sovereign, they concurrently retain their office subject to their holding the confidence of the lower house of Parliament. When the lower house has passed a motion of no confidence in the government, the government must immediately resign or submit itself to the electorate in a new general election.

Lastly, the head of state is in turn required to effectuate their executive power only through these responsible ministers. They must never attempt to set up a "shadow" government of executives or advisors and attempt to use them as instruments of government, or to rely upon their "unofficial" advice. They are bound to take no decision or action that is put into effect under the colour of their executive power without that action being as a result of the counsel and advisement of their responsible ministers. Their ministers are required to counsel them (i.e., explain to them and be sure they understand any issue that they will be called upon to decide) and to form and have recommendations for them (i.e., their advice or advisement) to choose from, which are the ministers' formal, reasoned recommendations as to what course of action should be taken.

History in the British Empire

From the middle of the 19th century, the United Kingdom began to introduce systems of responsible government to the colonial governments of its settler colonies including in Canada, Australia, New Zealand and South Africa. These systems were heavily based upon the system that had developed in the United Kingdom itself with a bicameral legislature and an executive responsible to the Lower House.

Canada 

Responsible government was implemented in several colonies of British North America (present day Canada), between 1848 and 1850, with the executive council formulating policy with the assistance of the legislative branch, the legislature voting approval or disapproval, and the appointed governor enacting those policies that it had approved. This replaced the previous system whereby the governor took advice from an executive council, and used the legislature chiefly to raise money.

Responsible government was a major element of the gradual development of Canada towards independence. The concept of responsible government is associated in Canada more with self-government than with parliamentary accountability; hence there is the notion that the Dominion of Newfoundland "gave up responsible government" when it suspended its self-governing status in 1933, as a result of financial problems. It did not regain responsible government until it became a province of Canada in 1949.

Background

After the formation of elected legislative assemblies starting with Nova Scotia in 1758, governors and their executive councils did not require the consent of elected legislators in order to carry out all their roles.  It was only in the decades leading up to Canadian Confederation in 1867 that the governing councils of those British North American colonies became responsible to the elected representatives of the people.

In the aftermath of the American Revolution, based on the perceived shortcomings of virtual representation, the British government became more sensitive to unrest in its remaining colonies with large populations of European-descended colonists. Elected assemblies were introduced to both Upper Canada and Lower Canada with the Constitutional Act of 1791. Many reformers thought that these assemblies should have some control over the executive power, leading to political unrest between the governors and assemblies in both Upper and Lower Canada. The Lieutenant Governor of Upper Canada Sir Francis Bond Head wrote in one dispatch to London that if responsible government were implemented "Democracy, in the worst possible Form, will prevail in our Colonies."

After the Rebellions of 1837–1838 in the Canadas, Lord Durham was appointed governor general of British North America and had the task of examining the issues and determining how to defuse tensions. In his report, one of his recommendations was that colonies which were developed enough should be granted "responsible government". This term specifically meant the policy that British-appointed governors should bow to the will of elected colonial assemblies.

Implementation

The first instance of responsible government in the British Empire outside of the United Kingdom itself was achieved by the colony of Nova Scotia in January–February 1848 through the efforts of Joseph Howe. Howe's push for responsible government was inspired by the work of Thomas McCulloch and Jotham Blanchard almost two decades earlier. The plaque in the Nova Scotia House of Assembly erected by the Historic Sites and Monuments Board of Canada reads:
First Responsible Government in the British Empire.
The first Executive Council chosen exclusively from the party having a majority in the representative branch of a colonial legislature was formed in Nova Scotia on 2 February 1848. Following a vote of want of confidence in the preceding Council, James Boyle Uniacke, who had moved the resolution, became Attorney General and leader of the Government. Joseph Howe, the long-time campaigner for this "Peaceable Revolution", became Provincial Secretary. Other members of the Council were Hugh Bell, Wm. F. Desbarres, Lawrence O.C. Doyle, Herbert Huntingdon, James McNab, Michael Tobin, and George R. Young.

The colony of New Brunswick soon followed in May 1848 when Lieutenant Governor Edmund Walker Head brought in a more balanced representation of Members of the Legislative Assembly to the Executive Council and ceded more powers to that body.

In the Province of Canada, responsible government was introduced with the ministry of Louis-Hippolyte LaFontaine and Robert Baldwin in spring 1848; it was put to the test in 1849, when Reformers in the legislature passed the Rebellion Losses Bill. This was a law that provided compensation to French-Canadians who suffered losses during the Rebellions of 1837–1838 in Lower-Canada.

The Governor General, Lord Elgin, had serious misgivings about the bill but nonetheless assented to it despite demands from the Tories that he refuse to do so. Elgin was physically assaulted by an English-speaking mob for this, and the Montreal Parliament building was burned to the ground in the ensuing riots. Nonetheless, the Rebellion Losses Bill helped entrench responsible government into Canadian politics.

In time, the granting of responsible government became the first step on the road to complete independence. Canada gradually gained greater and greater autonomy over a considerable period of time through inter imperial and commonwealth diplomacy, including the British North America Act of 1867, the Statute of Westminster of 1931, and even as late as the patriation of the Constitution Act in 1982 (see Constitution of Canada).

Australia and New Zealand 
Prior to European colonisation, the Australian continent was inhabited by Aboriginal and Torres Strait Island peoples, who had their own traditional forms of self-government. They were divided into various nations and clans and, in some cases, large alliances between several nations. In 1770, Royal Navy officer James Cook sailed along the east coast of Australia and claimed it for King George III, and in 1788 the First Fleet led by Arthur Phillip established the first permanent European settlement in Australia at Port Jackson. The settlers gradually expanded across the continent, displacing the indigenous population, until they had established six colonies; the legal system of these colonies were based on the common law system.

At first, the Australian colonies were run by autocratic Governors. They were appointed by the British monarch, but in practice the Governors exercised vast executive and legislative powers with very little oversight. This was due to the fact that most of the early colonies were penal colonies, the great distance from the United Kingdom and slow communication, as well as the enormous size and of the Australian colonies which were largely unexplored by Europeans and sparsely settled by them.

In 1808 there was a military coup d'état known as the Rum Rebellion, which deposed Governor Bligh and briefly established military rule over the Colony of New South Wales until a new Governor (Lachlan Macquarie) was appointed and sent from Britain. However this did nothing towards establishing responsible or representative government.

The early colonists, coming mostly from the United Kingdom (which by 1801 included Ireland), were familiar with the Westminster system and made efforts to reform local government in order to increase the opportunity for ordinary men to participate. The Governors and London therefore set in motion a gradual process of establishing a Westminster system in the colonies, not so fast as to get ahead of population or economic growth, nor so slow as to provoke clamouring for revolutionary change as happened in the American Revolutionary War and threatened in the Rebellions of 1837–1838 in Canada. This first took the form of appointed or partially elected Legislative Councils.

The most violent move towards responsible government occurred in the Colony of Victoria during the 1850s where there was growing discontent and civil disobedience, especially in the inland gold fields areas. This culminated in the 1854 Eureka Rebellion near Ballarat. 190 miners armed themselves, erected a stockade and raised the Southern Cross Flag. They demanded an end to taxation (via an expensive miner's license) without representation, as well as upkeep of the area' roads and the right to vote in colonial elections.

The British colonial forces overran the stockade, capturing or killing dozens of miners and bringing many to Melbourne for trial. However, mass public support led to the miners' release and, within a year, most of their demands had been met, including responsible self-government and universal male suffrage for the Colony of Victoria.

The Eureka Rebellion and events in Victoria resonated around the Australian colonies, which also had their own agitators for change. South Australia was quick to pass universal male suffrage, and Victoria and New South Wales followed soon after. By the end of the 1850s, all the Australian colonies and New Zealand had achieved responsible self-government, aside from Western Australia which took until 1890.

The Northern Territory was originally part of South Australia, but transferred to the Australian Commonwealth Government in 1911. It then lost responsible self-government (although residents could still vote in federal elections) and only gained it back in 1974. Likewise, the Australian Capital Territory was originally part of New South Wales. It was transferred to the Commonwealth Government in 1911 and lost responsible self-government until 1989.

Participation by women and indigenous people

Female suffrage (and thus universal suffrage) was gained in 1890s-1910s in Australia and New Zealand (1893), allowing the other half of the population to participate in responsible representative government.

In New Zealand, the English and te reo maori versions of the 1840 Treaty of Waitangi had different wording, which fueled disagreement over how the land should be governed, owned and sold. This was one of the causes of the later New Zealand Wars (1845-1872) over land and governance, in which Maori fought on both sides. These events fueled debate in the 1860s about Maori representation in the colonial Parliament. As a result, Maori men were granted legal suffrage in 1867 (12 years before European New Zealanders) through specially reserved Maori seats which only Maori could vote in, although voting turnout was very low until the 1880s and 1890s.

In Australia, during the colonial period, some Aboriginal and Torres Strait Islander people may have theoretically had the right to vote in colonial elections. However, in practice they were almost always unable to exercise this right due to living a traditional lifestyle in remote areas uncontacted by the colony, or being affected by the Frontier Wars, or due to racial discrimination or property requirements for voting.

After federation, the Commonwealth Franchise Act of 1902 barred Aboriginal and Torres Strait Islander people from voting in federal elections unless they were already eligible to vote in their state. Queensland explicitly barred Aboriginal and Torres Strait Islander people from voting until the 1960s, while Western Australia barred Aboriginal people unless they successfully applied to become citizens. As a result, most Aboriginal people across the country were prevented from voting, including those who in theory had the right. Later, the 1962 Commonwealth Electoral Act gave all Aboriginal people the option to enrol to vote, but still most were not able to exercise their rights.

This largely changed after the 1967 Australian referendum, which allowed the federal government to count Indigenous Australians in the census, and to ensure that their voting rights were in fact respected across the country.

Cape Colony 

The Cape Colony, in Southern Africa, was under responsible self-government from 1872 until 1910 when it became the Cape Province of the new Union of South Africa.

Under its previous system of representative government, the Ministers of the Cape Government reported directly to the British Imperial Governor, and not to the locally elected representatives in the Cape Parliament. Among Cape citizens of all races, growing anger at their powerlessness in influencing unpopular imperial decisions had repeatedly led to protests and rowdy political meetings – especially during the early "Convict Crisis" of the 1840s.
A popular political movement for responsible government soon emerged, under local leader John Molteno. A protracted struggle was then conducted over the ensuing years as the movement (known informally as "the responsibles") grew increasingly powerful, and used their parliamentary majority to put pressure on the British Governor, withholding public finances from him, and conducting public agitations. Not everyone favoured responsible government though, and pro-imperial press outlets even accused the movement of constituting "crafts and assaults of the devil".

Supporters believed that the most effective means of instituting responsible government was simply to change the section of the constitution which prevented government officials from being elected to parliament or members of parliament from serving in executive positions. The conflict therefore centred on the changing of this specific section. "Although responsible government merely required an amendment to s.79 of the constitution, it transpired only after nearly twenty years in 1872 when the so-called "responsibles" under Molteno were able to command sufficient support in both houses to secure the passage of the necessary bill." Finally, with a parliamentary majority and with the Colonial Office and new Governor Henry Barkly won over, Molteno instituted responsible government, making the Ministers directly responsible to the Cape Parliament, and becoming the Cape's first Prime Minister.

The ensuing period saw an economic recovery, a massive growth in exports and an expansion of the colony's frontiers. Despite political complications that arose from time to time (such as an ill-fated scheme by the British Colonial Office to enforce a confederation in Southern Africa in 1878, and tensions with the Afrikaner-dominated Government of Transvaal over trade and railroad construction), economic and social progress in the Cape Colony continued at a steady pace until a renewed attempt to extend British control over the hinterland caused the outbreak of the Anglo-Boer Wars in 1899.

An important feature of the Cape Colony under responsible government was that it was the only state in southern Africa (and one of very few in the world at the time) to have a non-racial system of voting.

Later however – following the South Africa Act 1909 to form the Union of South Africa – this multi-racial universal suffrage was steadily eroded, and eventually abolished by the Apartheid government in 1948.

Former British colonies with responsible government 
The following is a list of British colonies, and the year when responsible government was established in the territory:
 1848 – Province of Nova Scotia
 1848 – Province of New Brunswick
 1848 – Province of Canada
 1851 – Prince Edward Island
 1855 – Newfoundland (suspended from 1934 to 1949), the Colony of New South Wales, and the Colony of Victoria
 1856 – Colony of New Zealand and the Colony of Tasmania
 1857 – Province of South Australia
 1859 – Colony of Queensland (separated from New South Wales in that year with self-government from the beginning)
 1872 – The Cape Colony, South Africa
 1890 – Colony of Western Australia
 1893 – Natal, South Africa
 1906 – Transvaal, South Africa
 1907 – Orange River Colony, South Africa
 1921 – Malta (suspended from 1936 to 1947, and from 1959 to 1962)
 1923 – Southern Rhodesia
 1947 – India
 1947 – Pakistan
 1948 – Israel (independence from the British Mandate)

In German history 

In the early 1860s, the Prussian Prime Minister Otto von Bismarck was involved in a bitter dispute with the Liberals, who sought to institute a system of responsible government modeled on that of Britain. Bismarck, who strongly opposed that demand, managed to deflect the pressure by embarking energetically and successfully on the unification of Germany. The Liberals, who were also strong German nationalists, backed Bismarck's unification efforts and tacitly accepted that the Constitution of Imperial Germany, crafted by Bismarck, did not include a responsible government – the Chancellor being accountable solely to the emperor and needing no parliamentary confidence. Germany gained a responsible government only with the Weimar Republic and more securely with the creation of the Federal Republic of Germany. Historians account the lack of responsible government in the formative decades of united Germany as one of the factors contributing to the prolonged weakness of German democratic institutions, lasting also after such a government was finally instituted.

See also 
 Fusion of powers

Notes

References

Citations

Sources 

 Arthur Berriedale Keith. Responsible Government in the Dominions, 1912.
 Molteno, P. A. The Life and Times of John Charles Molteno. Comprising a History of Representative Institutions and Responsible Government at the Cape. London: Smith, Elder & Co., Waterloo Place, 1900.
 Status and Respectability in the Cape Colony, 1750–1870: A Tragedy of Manners. Robert Ross, David Anderson. Cambridge University Press. 1999. .

Further reading 
 
 
 
 
 

Constitution of Canada
Political history of Canada
Politics of New Zealand
Political history of Australia
Westminster system
Political terms in the United Kingdom
Political terminology in Canada
Political terminology in Australia
Accountability
Governance of the British Empire
1872 establishments in the Cape Colony
Political history of South Africa
Politics of the Cape Colony